The Caudron R.4 (officially Caudron 40 A.3) was a French World War I twin-engine biplane reconnaissance/artillery cooperation aircraft and the progenitor of a series of successful aircraft that filled a variety of roles with the French Aéronautique Militaire.

Development
The first prototype was completed in June 1915 however it wasn't until November that the first examples was handed over to the authorities for service evaluation when it was found to be underpowered and suffered from poor manoeuvrability and a low service ceiling, which precluded it from being used in its intended role as a bomber. 
While developing the aircraft, a number of crashes occurred of which the most disastrous for Caudron occurred on 12 December 1915, when Gaston Caudron was killed while testing an early production aircraft. These crashes were found to be the result of structural deficiencies, which required substantial redesign, particularly of the center-section wing spars. This redesign work was carried out by Henry Potez.

While the brothers Caudron had collaborated closely in aircraft design up to this point, the similar G.5 and G.6 were the work of Gaston Caudron, while the R.4 was by René Caudron. These were a radical departure from their increasingly obsolete predecessors, the G.3 and G.4, both of which were pod and boom designs, and were difficult to defend due to the positions of the crew. In contrast the R.4 had a streamlined, full-length fuselage and single fin and rudder, and three cockpits, with gunners ahead and behind the wings, and the pilot just behind the wing. The unequal-span wings had three bays on each side of the strut-mounted engines, and were fitted with ailerons on the upper wing only.  As well as the twin-wheel main landing gear units and tailskid, the R.4 could be identified from other Caudrons by its single nose-wheel which was a common feature on French bombers and was intended to prevent nose-overs in the event of a rough landing. Its unimpressive climb rate and poor ceiling resulted in a few aircraft being tested with more powerful  Hispano-Suiza 8Aa engines. The new Caudron chief designer, Paul Deville, then set to work further refining the design. The result would be the Caudron R.11. 
Development delays meant the first aircraft didn't reach the front lines until late 1916, so that only one example was in service at the start of October.

Operational history

The R.4 performed well in the reconnaissance role and managed to shoot down a considerable number of enemy aircraft. 
In early use Escadrille C.46 had claimed 34 German aircraft brought down with its R.4s in an eight-week period, but it was clear that an improved ceiling and greater manoeuvrability were necessary. Production of the R.4 ended after 249 had been built.  In the reconnaissance escadrilles it was progressively replaced by Sopwith 1 A.2s, SPAD XIs, Breguet 14s and Letord 1s in 1917 and 1918.

Variants
Caudron R.3 precursor to R.4 powered with  Le Rhône 9C rotary engines.
Caudron R.4 company designation for  Renault 12Db-powered aircraft
Caudron 40 A.3 official STAé designation (rarely used)
Caudron R.19 unofficial SFA designation for Renault powered variant (rarely used)
Caudron R.4 type 8 unofficial/company designation for  Hispano-Suiza 8A powered prototype.
Caudron R.5 bomber prototype with more powerful  Renault 12A engines.

Operators

Aéronautique Militaire
Escadrille R46
Escadrille R207
Escadrille R210
Escadrille R212
Escadrille R214
Escadrille R217

Specifications

References

Citations

Bibliography

See also

1910s French bomber aircraft
1910s French military reconnaissance aircraft
Military aircraft of World War I
R004
Biplanes
Aircraft first flown in 1915